The  is a railway museum in Ōme, Tokyo, Japan. It opened in 1962, and is operated by the East Japan Railway Culture Foundation, a foundation established by East Japan Railway Company.

Exhibits
Eight steam locomotives, one electric locomotive and one 0 Series Shinkansen EMU car are on display. (as of October 2022)

 Shinkansen car 22-75 was repainted into Tohoku ivory/green livery for short period in late 1980s.
 JNR Class C51 steam locomotive No. C51 5 was also preserved here until it was moved to the Railway Museum in Saitama, Saitama.
 JGR Class 110 steam locomotive No. 110 was also sectioned and put on display here, until its sectioned part was restored was moved to CIAL Sakuragichō Station in June 2020.

Access
The museum is located 15 minutes walk from Ome Station on the Ome Line.

Address
2-155 Katsunuma, Ōme, Tokyo

References

External links

 
 List of engines

Museums established in 1962
Museums in Tokyo
Railway museums in Japan
Open-air museums in Japan
1962 establishments in Japan
Ōme, Tokyo
East Japan Railway Company